Labisia is a genus of flowering plants in the family Primulaceae, native to the Malesia biogeographical region. Its best known species is Labisia pumila, which is cultivated as a medicinal herb in Malaysia and Indonesia for, among other things, improving libido in women, induction of childbirth, and relieving postmenopausal discomfort.

Species
Currently accepted species include:
Labisia acuta Ridl.
Labisia alata N.E.Br.
Labisia longistyla King & Gamble
Labisia obtusifolia Hallier f.
Labisia ovalifolia Ridl.
Labisia posthumusiana Sunarno
Labisia pumila (Blume) Fern.-Vill.
Labisia serrulata Hallier f.
Labisia sessilifolia Hallier f.
Labisia smaragdina L.Linden & Rodigas
Labisia steenisiana Sunarno
Labisia sumatrensis Sunarno

References

Primulaceae
Primulaceae genera